The rustyhead snake (Amastridium veliferum), also known commonly as the rufous-headed snake, is a species of snake in the family Colubridae. The species is endemic to Central America and Colombia.

Taxonomy
Amastridium veliferum is one of only two recognized species in the genus Amastridium.

Geographic range
Amastridium veliferum is found in Colombia, Costa Rica, Guatemala, Nicaragua, and Panama.

Habitat

Reproduction
Amastridium veliferum is oviparous.

References

Further reading
Boulenger GA (1894). Catalogue of the Snakes in the British Museum (Natural History). Volume II., Containing the Conclusion of the Colubridæ Aglyphæ. London: Trustees of the British Museum (Natural History). (Taylor and Francis, printers). xi + 382 pp. + Plates I-XX. (Genus Amastridium and species A. veliferum, p. 352).
Cope ED (1860). "Descriptions of Reptiles from Tropical America and Asia". Proc. Acad. Nat. Sci. Philadelphia 1860: 368-374. (Amastridium, new genus, p. 370; A. veliferum, new species, pp. 370–371).
Heimes P (2016). Snakes of Mexico: Herpetofaua Mexicana Vol. I. Frankfurt, Germany: Chimaira. 572 pp. .

Amastridium
Reptiles of Colombia
Reptiles of Mexico
Snakes of Central America
Reptiles described in 1860
Reptiles of Costa Rica
Reptiles of Nicaragua
Reptiles of Panama
Taxa named by Edward Drinker Cope